Omar Santana Cabrera (born 14 April 1991) is a Spanish professional footballer who plays as a midfielder for Greek Super League 2 club Kallithea.

Career
From the summer 2017 to the summer 2019, Santana played for Polish club Miedź Legnica. He remained without club until 23 December 2019, where he returned to Miedź Legnica, signing a deal for the rest of the season with an option for a further year.

Career statistics

Club

Notes

References

External links
 

1991 births
Living people
People from Gran Canaria
Sportspeople from the Province of Las Palmas
Spanish footballers
Footballers from the Canary Islands
Association football midfielders
Segunda División B players
Tercera División players
Universidad de Las Palmas CF footballers
Atlético Madrid B players
Celta de Vigo B players
Ekstraklasa players
I liga players
Wigry Suwałki players
Miedź Legnica players
Cypriot First Division players
Olympiakos Nicosia players
Spanish expatriate footballers
Spanish expatriate sportspeople in Poland
Spanish expatriate sportspeople in Cyprus
Expatriate footballers in Poland
Expatriate footballers in Cyprus